Argentina competed at the 2004 Summer Olympics in Athens, Greece, from 13 to 29 August 2004. This was the nation's twenty-first appearance at the Olympic Games, except for three different editions. Argentina did not attend the 1904 Summer Olympics in St. Louis, the 1912 Summer Olympics in Stockholm, and the 1980 Summer Olympics in Moscow, because of its support for the United States-led boycott. The sailor Carlos Espínola was the nation's flag bearer at the opening ceremony. 152 competitors, 106 men and 46 women, took part in 86 events in 22 sports.

The total medal count of six, marked the best performance by Argentina since the 1948 Summer Olympics, earning their first gold medals since the 1952 Summer Olympics and their best position in the medal table up to that point, at 35th place overall.

Medalists

Athletics

Argentine athletes achieved qualifying standards in the following athletics events (up to a maximum of 3 athletes in each event at the 'A' Standard, and 1 at the 'B' Standard):

Men
Field events

Combined events – Decathlon

Women
Track & road events

Field events

Basketball

Argentina qualified a men's team.

 Men's team event – 1 team of 12 players

Men's tournament

Roster

Group play

Quarterfinals

Semifinals

Gold medal game

 Won gold medal

Boxing

Canoeing

Two competitors joined Argentina for the canoeing flatwater event only.

Sprint
Argentina qualified boats for the following events.

Qualification Legend: Q = Qualify to final; q = Qualify to semifinal

Cycling

Track
Omnium

Mountain biking

Equestrian

Jumping

Fencing

Argentina qualified 1 fencer.

Women

Field hockey

Men's tournament

Roster

Group play

9th to 12th place classification

11th place match

Women's tournament

Roster

Group play

Semifinals

Bronze Medal match

 Won Bronze Medal

Football

Men's tournament

Roster

Group play

Quarterfinals

Semifinals

Gold Medal match

 Won Gold Medal

Gymnastics

Argentina had one woman competing in artistic gymnastics as an individual.

Artistic
Women

Judo

Argentina qualified nine judoka.

Men

Women

Rowing

Men

Women

Qualification Legend: FA=Final A (medal); FB=Final B (non-medal); FC=Final C (non-medal); FD=Final D (non-medal); FE=Final E (non-medal); FF=Final F (non-medal); SA/B=Semifinals A/B; SC/D=Semifinals C/D; SE/F=Semifinals E/F; R=Repechage

Sailing

Men

Women

Open

M = Medal race; OCS = On course side of the starting line; DSQ = Disqualified; DNF = Did not finish; DNS= Did not start; RDG = Redress given

Shooting 

Men

Swimming

Argentine swimmers earned qualifying standards in the following events (up to a maximum of 2 swimmers in each event at the A-standard time, and 1 at the B-standard time):

Men

Women

Table tennis

Taekwondo

Tennis

Men

Women

Triathlon

Volleyball

Beach

Indoor

Argentina qualified a team to the men's indoor tournament.

 Men's indoor event – 1 team of 12 players

Men's tournament

Roster

Group play

Quarterfinal

Weightlifting

See also
 Argentina at the 2003 Pan American Games
 Argentina at the 2004 Summer Paralympics

References

External links
Official Report of the XXVIII Olympiad
Comité Olímpico Argentino 

Nations at the 2004 Summer Olympics
2004
Summer Olympics